The Reno Police Department (RPD) is the police department of the City of Reno in Washoe County in northern Nevada.

History 
RPD was established in 1903 to serve the growing community of Reno, which at that time consisted of a couple of square miles and had a population of around 1000. Since then, RPD has grown along with the rest of the city.

Structure
The Department is led by a chief of police, who reports to the city manager.

Three main divisions exist: Administration, Support, and operations.

Administration includes command staff, grant and records departments.

Support has Detective, Regional Operations, and Internal Affairs.

Operations handles Patrolling.

Other Programs 
Ride-Along program allows a citizen to ride with a police officer, while she or he is working
Neighborhood Watch
Community Presentations
Citizens Police Academy shows citizens the many skills a police officer needs

In popular culture 
In the Comedy Central series Reno 911!, the fictional Reno Sheriff's Department is the main focus of attention, which is a spin on the RPD.

Notes

External links
Reno Police Department Official Web Site

Municipal police departments of Nevada
Government of Reno, Nevada
1903 establishments in Nevada